The Canadian Mixed Curling Championship is the national curling championship for mixed curling in Canada. The winners of the tournament will represent Canada at the World Mixed Curling Championship.

In mixed curling, the positions on a team must alternate between men and women. If a man throws last rocks, which is usually the case, the women must throw lead rocks and third rocks, while the other male member of the team throws second rocks. In 2004, Shannon Kleibrink became the only woman to skip a team and win a Canadian Mixed championship.

History
The Canadian Mixed Curling Championship was established in 1964, with Canadian Breweries as the event's sponsor and Frank Sargent as its committee chairman. For the first two years it was held at the Royal Canadian Curling Club in Toronto. The first championship was won by Ernie Boushy of Winnipeg with a record of 9-1.

In 1973, Seagram Distillers became the new official sponsor, until 1983.

Up until 1995, the event was typically held in March, but was bumped up to January that year when Unitel became a sponsor. That was also the year that the "Season of Champions" event series was implemented, and the Page playoffs began to be used.

Unitel's parent company AT&T became the sponsor in 1997, a partnership that only lasted until 1998. The event was dropped as a Season of Champions event in 2004, and was no longer shown on television. In 2005, the page playoff system was dropped and replaced by a 3-team playoff. The 2005 event was bumped up to November of the previous year, and the event has been held in November ever since, and is why the event was not held in the year it was billed as until the COVID-19 pandemic cancelled the November 2020 event. 

Starting with the 2008 Championships (held in November 2007), the Canadian Curling Association picked two curlers from the winning team to represent Canada at the World Mixed Doubles Curling Championship. This ended with the 2012 Mixed Championship, with the creation of the Canadian Mixed Doubles Curling Trials.

Champions
The past champions of the event are listed as follows:

Notes

References

External links
Canadian Mixed Curling Championship history

 
Recurring sporting events established in 1964
1964 establishments in Canada